Glen Helen Gorge is a gorge on the Finke River, located  west of Alice Springs in the Northern Territory of Australia. It lies within the West MacDonnell National Park.

References 

Canyons and gorges in the Northern Territory